Fyers is a surname. Notable people with the surname include:

 A. B. Fyers (1829–1883), British surveyor in Ceylon
 Eddie Fyers, a fictional character in DC Comics
 William Fyers (1815–1895), British Army officer

FYERS is an acronym for Focus Your Energy and Reform Yourself. It is an Indian financial services company that offers commission-free trading and investment services.

Notes